Konio Heagi (born 3 July 1973) is a Papua New Guinean woman cricketer. She played for Papua New Guinea at the 2008 Women's Cricket World Cup Qualifier.

References

External links 

1973 births
Living people
Papua New Guinean women cricketers
People from the National Capital District (Papua New Guinea)